The 14th Wisconsin Infantry Regiment was a volunteer infantry regiment that served in the Union Army during the American Civil War. Four of its members received the Medal of Honor for service in the Second Battle of Corinth, October 3 and 4, 1862; among them the Color-Sergeant Denis Murphy (Green Bay), who, though wounded 3 times, continued bearing the colors throughout the battle.

Service
The 14th Wisconsin was raised at Fond du Lac, Wisconsin, under Colonel David E. Wood.  Wood was a prominent Fond du Lac citizen, former legislator and Circuit Court judge.  The camp in Fond du Lac where they trained was renamed "Camp Wood," after him. The 14th Wisconsin was mustered into Federal service on January 30, 1862.

The regiment was mustered out on October 9, 1865, at Mobile, Alabama.

Casualties
The 14th Wisconsin suffered 6 officers and 116 enlisted men killed in action or who later died of their wounds, plus another 3 officers and 194 enlisted men (including Col. Wood) who died of disease, for a total of 319 fatalities.

A metal plaque on the grounds of Camp Randall in Madison, Wisconsin, states that 27 members of the 14th Wisconsin—all of whom are named on the plaque—died as a result of wounds received on April 7, 1862.

Commanders
 Colonel David E. Wood (January 30, 1862June 17, 1862) wounded at Shiloh, died of disease.
 Colonel John Hancock (June 17, 1862January 23, 1863) wounded at the Second Battle of Corinth, resigned due to disability.
 Colonel Lyman M. Ward (January 23, 1863October 9, 1865) mustered out with the regiment, received brevet to brigadier general.
 Captain Carlos M. G. Mansfield (acting March 6, 1864November 1864) acted as commander of the regiment while Colonel Ward was in command of the brigade.
 Lt. Colonel Eddy F. Ferris (acting November 1864October 9, 1865) acted as commander of the regiment while Colonel Ward was in command of the brigade.

Notable members
 Calvin R. Johnson, captain of Co. I, after the war became a Wisconsin state representative and county judge.
 Isaac E. Messmore, lieutenant colonel, wounded at Shiloh, later became colonel of the 31st Wisconsin Infantry Regiment. 
 Denis J. F. Murphy, sergeant, received the Medal of Honor for actions in the Second Battle of Corinth, where he was wounded three times.
 John Milton Read was sergeant major and then commissioned adjutant of the regiment, he later served as adjutant of the brigade.  He was wounded and captured at Second Corinth, but quickly paroled.  He was later wounded at Vicksburg.  After the war he became a Wisconsin state senator.
 Van Eps Young was first lieutenant of Co. H and adjutant of the regiment from May 1862 to May 1863.  He afterward became colonel of the 49th United States Colored Infantry Regiment and was provost marshal of western Mississippi from 1864 through 1866.  After the war he served as a Wisconsin state senator.

See also

 List of Wisconsin Civil War units
 Wisconsin in the American Civil War

Further reading

References

External links
The Civil War Archive
102-year-old veteran of the 14th Wisconsin Infantry{reference only}

Military units and formations established in 1862
Military units and formations disestablished in 1865
Units and formations of the Union Army from Wisconsin
1862 establishments in Wisconsin
1865 disestablishments in Alabama